The War Room is a 1993 American documentary film.

The War Room or War Room may also refer to:
 War room or command center
 The War Room with Michael Shure, a news and political commentary program on Current TV
 The War Room with Owen Shroyer, an internet/talk radio program on InfoWars
 The War Room with Quinn and Rose, a syndicated talk radio program
 The War Room (EP), a 2012 EP by Public Service Broadcasting
 "The War Room" (Roseanne), a 1997 television episode
 The War Room, a novel by Bryan Malessa
 War Room (video game), a ColecoVision video game
 War Room (Wally Hedrick), an artwork by Wally Hedrick
 War Room (film), a 2015 American film directed by Alex Kendrick

See also
 VAR Room
 Incident room
 Situation Room (disambiguation)